Howard Marshall is the name of:

Howard Marshall (broadcaster) (1900–1973), English sports broadcaster
Howard Marshall (rugby union) (1870–1929), English rugby union player
I. Howard Marshall (1934–2015), biblical scholar
J. Howard Marshall (1905–1995), American oil business executive
J. Howard Marshall III (born 1936), American businessman